Bradysia austera is a species of fungus gnat found in the British Isles.

References

Further reading
 Heller, Kai, Pekka Vilkamaa, and Heikki Hippa. "An annotated check list of Swedish black fungus gnats (Diptera, Sciaridae)." Sahlbergia 15.1 (2009): 23-51.

External links

Sciaridae
Insects described in 2006